The 2019 World Junior Ice Hockey Championship Division I consisted of two tiered groups of six teams each: the second-tier Division I A and the third-tier Division I B. For each tier's tournament, the team which placed first was promoted to the next highest division, while the team which placed last was relegated to a lower division.

To be eligible as a junior player in these tournaments, a player couldn't be born earlier than 1999.

Division I A
The Division I A tournament was played in Füssen, Germany, from 9 to 15 December 2018.

Participants

Match officials
4 referees and 7 linesmen were selected for the tournament.

Referees
 Thomas Andersen
 Denis Naumov
 Vladimír Pešina
 Liam Sewell

Linesmen
 Thomas Caillot
 Gabriel Gaube
 Niklas Knosen
 Tommi Niittylä
 Ulrich Pardatscher
 Elias Seewald
 Dániel Soós

Standings

Results
All times are local (UTC+1).

Statistics

Top 10 scorers

GP = Games played; G = Goals; A = Assists; Pts = Points; +/− = Plus-minus; PIM = Penalties In Minutes
Source: IIHF.com

Goaltending leaders
(minimum 40% team's total ice time)

TOI = Time on ice (minutes:seconds); GA = Goals against; GAA = Goals against average; Sv% = Save percentage; SO = Shutouts
Source: IIHF.com

Best Players Selected by the Directorate
 Goaltender:  Hendrik Hane
 Defenceman:  Moritz Seider
 Forward:  Ivan Drozdov

Division I B
The Division I B tournament was played in Tychy, Poland, from 8 to 14 December 2018.

Participants

Match officials
4 referees and 7 linesmen were selected for the tournament.

Referees
 Pierre Dehaen
 Christian Persson
 Maksim Toode
 Hub Van Grinsven

Linesmen
 Andreas Hofer
 Aleh Kliashcheunikau
 Andrei Korovkin
 Paweł Kosidło
 Rafał Noworyta
 Jakob Schauer
 Nikita Vilyugin

Standings

Results
All times are local (UTC+1).

Statistics

Top 10 scorers

GP = Games played; G = Goals; A = Assists; Pts = Points; +/− = Plus-minus; PIM = Penalties In Minutes
Source: IIHF.com

Goaltending leaders
(minimum 40% team's total ice time)

TOI = Time on ice (minutes:seconds); GA = Goals against; GAA = Goals against average; Sv% = Save percentage; SO = Shutouts
Source: IIHF.com

Best Players Selected by the Directorate
 Goaltender:  Davide Fadani
 Defenceman:  Olaf Bizacki
 Forward:  Jan Drozg

References

External links
Division I A
Division I B

I
World Junior Ice Hockey Championships – Division I
International ice hockey competitions hosted by Germany
International ice hockey competitions hosted by Poland
2018–19 in German ice hockey
2018–19 in Polish ice hockey
Sport in Tychy
IIHF